Rita Streich (18 December 192020 March 1987) was one of the most admired and recorded lyric coloratura sopranos of the post-war period.

Biography
Rita Streich was born in Barnaul, southern Siberia, in the Russian Soviet Federative Socialist Republic (RSFSR), to a German father who had been a prisoner of war there, and a Russian mother. She moved to Germany with her parents during her childhood. She grew up speaking both German and Russian fluently, something that was extremely helpful during her later career. Among her teachers were Willi Domgraf-Fassbaender, Erna Berger and Maria Ivogün.

She made her debut in opera during the Second World War at the Stadttheater of Aussig, now Ústí nad Labem in Bohemia, in the role of Zerbinetta in Richard Strauss' opera Ariadne auf Naxos, in 1943. Three years later she secured her first engagement at the Staatsoper Unter den Linden in Berlin, where she sang until 1952. In that year she moved to Bayreuth, in 1953 to Vienna, and in 1954 to Salzburg. Appearances at La Scala in Milan and at the Covent Garden followed.

In 1974, she taught at the Folkwang Hochschule in Essen and the Music Academy in Vienna. She gave master classes during the Salzburg Festival in 1983, four years before her death in Vienna.

Her repertoire included roles in Idomeneo, Così fan tutte, Die Entführung aus dem Serail, The Magic Flute, The Marriage of Figaro, Don Giovanni, Der Rosenkavalier, Siegfried (the Forest Bird) and others. Since she had grown up bilingual, she could also sing Rimsky-Korsakov in the original Russian almost without accent. She was also active in operetta. She made recordings of many classical Viennese operettas, for instance Die Fledermaus, Eine Nacht in Venedig, Der Zigeunerbaron, Boccaccio, Der Bettelstudent and Der Zarewitsch.

Her recording of Puccini's "O mio babbino caro" with the Deutsche Oper Berlin Orchestra conducted by Reinhard Peters, was heard in the 2007 film "Mr. Bean's Holiday"  with Rowan Atkinson lip-synching.

Selected filmography
 The Merry Wives of Windsor (1950)
 Not Without Gisela (1951)
 The Stronger Woman (1953)

References

Bibliography 
 The Last Prima Donnas, by Lanfranco Rasponi, Alfred A Knopf, 1982.

External links 

 
 
 Singing Adele's Laughing Song from DIE FLEDERMAUS.  Audio only.  YouTube.
 Singing Mozart, on video.  YouTube.

1920 births
1987 deaths
People from Barnaul
German operatic sopranos
German expatriates in Austria
German people of Russian descent
20th-century German women opera singers
Academic staff of the Folkwang University of the Arts
Soviet emigrants to Germany
Deutsche Grammophon artists